Scott Hunter Gault (born January 31, 1983, in Berkeley, California) is an American rower. He won the bronze medal in the coxless four at the 2012 Summer Olympics, having finished in 5th place in the men's quadruple sculls at the 2008 Summer Olympics. He is a 2005 graduate of the University of Washington.

References

1983 births
Living people
Sportspeople from California
Rowers at the 2008 Summer Olympics
Rowers at the 2012 Summer Olympics
Olympic bronze medalists for the United States in rowing
Medalists at the 2012 Summer Olympics
American male rowers